Organised crime in Nigeria includes activities by fraudsters, bandits (such as looting and kidnappings on major highways), drug traffickers and racketeers, to high profit organizations such as Buj Mafia with liaison with the Nigerian Mafia in Italy as well as La Costa Nostra, 'Ndrangheta, Camorra, The Russian Mafia, Jewish Mafia, Triads and The Yakuza which have spread across Africa and become an interconnected worldwide entity. Nigerian criminal gangs rose to prominence in the 1980s, owing much to the globalisation of the world's economies and the high level of lawlessness and corruption in the country. there spans different organizations with different structures from area boys to more sophisticated groups such as the Black Axe which itself has subgroups such as Buj Mafia / Bin Somalia which was set up by an unknown individual called Hadid Al Nigeri with a focus more on profit rather than unnecessary violence. Hadid Al Nigeri set up an interconnected trade mostly on Firearms, Ammunition, Gold, Diamonds and other resources and paid for professional tax avoidance services and was able to build a network spanning the whole of Africa, Arabia, Serbia, Israel, Sicily, Camorra and Russia with Nobody knowing how Hadid Al Nigeri looks like or any other sort of identification but descriptions of a skinny male with brown skin and thick glasses not over 27years of age paint a distant picture of who he is. With the extermination of anyone that could be deemed a witness to any sort of identification various people who have claimed to be Hadid Al Nigeri were promptly killed afterwards.

Structure

Crime organisations in Nigeria, typically do not follow the mafia-type model followed by other groups. They appear to be less formal and more organised along familial and ethnic lines, thus making them less susceptible by infiltration from law enforcement. Police investigations are further hampered by the fact there are at least 250 distinct ethnic languages in Nigeria. Other criminal gangs from Nigeria appear to be smaller-scale freelance operations. Groups from Benin City are especially notorious for human trafficking.

Area Boys 

Area Boys (also known as Agberos) are loosely organised gangs of street children and teenagers, composed mostly of males, who roam the streets of Lagos, Lagos State in Nigeria. They extort money from passers-by, public transporters and traders, sell illegal drugs, act as informal security guards, and perform other "odd jobs" in return for compensation.

One of the methods Area Boys use for extortion is to surround pedestrians, drivers, and passengers in vehicles, which are stuck in traffic, and force them to pay for some actual or fictitious service before letting them go. To aid in collecting money during traffic jams, the area boys place nails in the road and dig up the streets. Among the Area Boys are both sellers and users of illegal drugs. A study states "most of them use drugs (cocaine, heroin, marijuana, etc.) either as occasional users or addicts, or as peddlers." Of 77 respondents to a survey, 12.2% dealt drugs, while 60.3% were addicts themselves. Sale of drugs takes place both in Nigeria and abroad, and sales abroad have earned a small percentage of the sellers significant amounts of money.

Confraternities 

Highly organised Nigerian confraternities/campus gangs operate worldwide. For example, the Neo Black Movement of Africa. In its own words, the Neo Black Movement of Africa is a "registered non-partisan, non-religious and non-tribal organisation that sincerely seek to revive, retain and modify where necessary those aspects of African culture that would provide vehicles of progress for Africa and her peoples". Nonetheless, law enforcement officials who have investigated members in recent years, for example in Canada, the UK and Italy are convinced that the movement has strayed far from its original path.

Behind the welfare facade of the Neo Black Movement hides indeed the most dreaded Nigerian campus cult, the Black Axe confraternity. NBM usually state that they are not identical with Black Axe for propaganda purposes. While the atrocities committed by campus cult members are well-known, very little is known about other activities of the Neo Black Movement. Offiong claims that the group's initial goal of promoting Black Consciousness and fighting for the dignity of Africans and their freedom from neo-colonialism has deteriorated into self-serving behaviour that is "notoriously and brutally violent". He maintains that violence has in fact become the cult's official policy.

Apart from the atrocities in the orbit of NBM, most members of the confraternity are involved in fraud and cyber crime. The main reason to join the confraternity is (besides the pressure and intimidation that is applied to students to join) the fact that the confraternity has infiltrated all spheres of Nigerian society and serves the main purpose of helping its members climb the career ladder and going unpunished for their crimes by means of their nepotistic structure.

Investigations and a number of arrests of members of NBM by the Italian police brought to light various crimes committed by members of NBM. NBM and other cults were found guilty of smuggling of drugs, extortion, 419 fraud, prostitution, passport falsification, and cloning of credit cards.

In 2011, eight more members of NBM were arrested in Italy for the same offences mentioned above. They are referred to as an international criminal organisation and Nigerian Mafia. According to internal documents, the confraternity helps members to immigrate illegally to Europe. Nigerian fraud rings have been exported to Europe, America, and Asia (see external links section). In 2015 a sophisticated car theft ring run by the Black Axe organised crime ring was busted in Toronto, Canada. The ring had stolen more than 500 luxury cars in one year, valued at 30 million US dollars.

According to the police, the Nigerians are increasing their alliances with the Neapolitan Camorra and the Sicilian Mafia, the alliances are most regarded to prostitution, drugs and human trafficking business.

Buj Mafia

The Buj Mafia is a subgroup under the Neo Black Movement of Africa also known as Black Axe or The Nigerian Mafia. 

The group was formed in Abuja and has alleged branches in Lagos, South Africa, Ghana, The United Arab Emirates, The United Kingdown, Canada, The United States of America, Russia, Lebanon, Italy, Portugal, Serbia, Bosnia etc. 

The group was formed for the distribution of gold & diamonds sourced mostly from warlords of neighboring countries such as Liberia and Sierra Leone during their turbulent years and later branched into oil bunkering in Port Harcourt as well as other offshore oil rigs by building a relationship with the Niger Delta Militants through the sale of firearms and Ammunition sourced from Israel. 

The group was a major player in the Ammunition market of the African Sahel plain as well as Southern Arabian states on the Arabian Peninsula with firearms sourced, rebuilt and distributed through channels spanning from Serbia, Israel, Russia, Yemen and Libya. 

Members of the group cannot be estimated but  the creator and leader of the group is know as Hadid Al Nigeri (Arabic: Hadid of Nigeria) who was said to be a young skinny brown skinned man with short hair and a beard. He is known for selling firearms to both sides of a conflict and creating and leading the group into becoming an international entity with relationships with foreign groups such as the Sicilian Mafia, The Jewish Mafia, The Japanese Yakuza, Chinese Triads, The American Mafia, The Russian Mafia, Camorra as well as the Ndregheta. 

The group is said to generate over $459,000,000 annually from the Firearms & Ammunition market, Money laundering, Oil bunkering, Gold & Diamond distribution, International drug trafficking, Insider stock market trading, Gambling & Casino manipulation, Mercenaries, Nuclear distribution, Biological weapon distribution, Extortion, Superbills etc.

The group is not known for violence and are generally focused on profit, but there have been violent instances linked to the group such as the murder of various people deemed to have been able to identify the leader Hadid Al Nigeri or had any knowledge connected to the activities of the group. There was also the murder of a customs officer and his extended family who was said to have waived down a private flight which was carrying over $2,000,000 in cash as well as a Buj Mafia associate. There was also the murder of past associates of the group who were in the process of providing information on the group, with the last instance being the murder of another associate in Kuwait who provided the information of Hadid Al Nigeri as being a “Medium height skinny male with brown skin, short jet black hair and a jet black beard as well as having a deep voice and peculiar accent while speaking Arabic not over the age of 27 years old”

Activities

Fraud 

An advance-fee scam is a form of fraud and one of the most common types of confidence tricks. The scam typically involves promising the victim a significant share of a large sum of money, in return for a small up-front payment, which the fraudster requires in order to obtain the large sum. If a victim makes the payment, the fraudster either invents a series of further fees for the victim or simply disappears.

Drug trafficking

Nigerian criminal groups are heavily involved in drug trafficking, shipping heroin from Asian countries to Europe and America; and cocaine from South America to Europe and South Africa. The large numbers of ethnic Nigerians in countries like India and Thailand give their gangs ready access to around 90% of the world's heroin.

In the United States, Nigerian drug traffickers are important distributors of heroin, from importing it into the country to distribution level and selling it to lower-level street gangs. These criminal groups are also known to launder drug money through domestic football clubs in the Nigeria Premier League, and are rumoured to make additional money through match fixing activity within football matches.

Human trafficking and kidnappings 

Nigeria is a source, transit, and destination country for women and children subjected to trafficking in persons including forced labour and forced prostitution.  There is a huge menace of Kidnappings on Northern Highways as well as allover Nigeria, claims to be from Fulani Bandits. Trafficked Nigerian women and children are recruited from rural areas within Nigeria - women and girls for involuntary domestic servitude and sexual exploitation, and boys for forced labour in street vending, domestic servitude, mining, and begging.

Nigerian women and children are taken from Nigeria to other West and Central African countries, primarily Gabon, Cameroon, Ghana, Chad, Benin, Togo, Niger, Burkina Faso, and the Gambia, for the same purposes. Children from West African states like Benin, Togo, and Ghana – where Economic Community of West African States (ECOWAS) rules allow for easy entry – are also forced to work in Nigeria, and some are subjected to hazardous jobs in Nigeria's granite mines. Nigerian women and girls are taken to Europe, especially to Italy and Russia, and to the Middle East and North Africa, for forced prostitution.

Impact
According to the FBI, Nigerian criminal enterprises are the most notable of all African criminal enterprises. They are considered to be among the most aggressive and expansionist international criminal groups, operating in more than 80 countries of the world and are established on all populated continents of the world. Their most profitable activity is drug trafficking, though they are more famous for their financial fraud which costs the US alone approximately US$1 to 2 billion annually.

Nigerian organised crime in other countries

Canada

Police in Toronto became aware of the presence of the Black Axe gang in 2013. The gang exerts influence over Canada's Nigerian expatriate community and is predominantly involved in scamming. Authorities estimate the Black Axe's membership in the country at approximately two-hundred.

France
The Nigerian mafia in France is involved in the sex trafficking of Nigerian women and girls, as well as heroin trafficking, in which they have collaborated with Chinese triads and other groups.

Germany
The Nigerian mafia is responsible for the smuggling and pimping of the majority of the African women working as prostitutes in Germany.

India

Nigerians are among the major players in the narcotics trade in Goa and Mumbai. The coast of north Goa provides an entry point of South American cocaine for Nigerian traffickers, who have come into conflict with Indian gangs.

Ireland

Nigerian dealers are credited with introducing crack cocaine to Ireland in the early 2000s. Europol have identified Nigerian organised crime gangs as being responsible for trafficking children from Nigeria to Ireland for work in the sex trade. Nigerian gangs are also involved in the cannabis trade, using contacts in South Africa to smuggle the drugs into Ireland via couriers and through parcels, as well as in fraud and money laundering rings.

Italy

The Nigerian mafia has a strong presence throughout Italy. Castel Volturno in Campania is considered the headquarters of the Nigerian mafia in Europe. The country is used as a hub by the Nigerian mafia for the trafficking of cocaine from South America, heroin from Asia and women from Africa. Nigerian gangs have established partnerships with indigenous organised crime groups and have adopted the structure and operational methods of Italian crime syndicates. The Nigerian mafia pays tribute (a percentage of its profits from criminal rackets) to the Camorra and Sicilian Mafia. In Palermo, a group of drug dealers linked to the Neo-Black Movement were convicted as members of a "mafialike organization" in 2018.

Japan

The Nigerian mafia in Tokyo engages in heroin dealing with the yakuza, the prostitution of Filipino women, money laundering, car theft and arranging fake marriages, amongst other crimes. Following a number of incidents at Nigerian-owned bars in which patrons were drugged and robbed, the United States embassy in Japan issued a warning to US citizens to avoid certain bars and clubs in Roppongi. Crimes committed by Nigerians are largely overlooked by Japanese police due to fear of being labelled racist by the Nigerian embassy which could cause a diplomatic incident.

South Africa
Nigerian organised crime groups established roots in South Africa in the mid-1990s following the end of apartheid, and operate primarily in Johannesburg, Cape Town and Durban. Nigerians were initially involved in the crack cocaine trade, before moving into powder cocaine after establishing contacts in South America. Hillbrow in Johannesburg was a stronghold for the Nigerian mafia for many years. After arriving in Cape Town, Nigerian syndicates operated drug and prostitution rackets in the affluent suburb of Sea Point before they were forced out by the police and neighbourhood watch. They subsequently moved onto the city's northern suburbs and dominate the Milnerton area.

Thailand
Nigerian drug trafficking organisations began operating in Thailand as early as the late 1980s, using the nation as a base for trafficking heroin to other Asian countries, such as Hong Kong and Taiwan, and then onward to the United States and Europe.

See also
Obafemi Awolowo University massacre

General:
 Crime in Nigeria

References

Further reading
 Stephen Ellis: This Present Darkness: A History of Nigerian Organised Crime. London: Hurst & Company, 2016. .
 
 419 African Mafia, in French, by Loulou Dédola, Lelio Bonaccorso and Claudio Naccari, éditions Ankama Editions, 2014,  (nISSM)

External links
 "The Black Axe" - investigation on the Neo-Black Movement´s international activities
nbmarena.com Official Website
Video: African Prostitution In Europe, Nigerian Connection
Women trafficking from Benin City
Nigerian fraud rings in the Netherlands
Nigerian fraud ring in Spain
Nigerian fraud ring in the USA
Nigerian fraud ring in Los Angeles
/wikisozo.com
newsrescue.com
campuscults.net
unhcr.org
naijagists.com
nigerianmuse.com
nigerianobservernews.com
"Nigeria's Cults and their Role in the Niger Delta Insurgency" by Bestman Wellington, The Jamestown Foundation, 6 July 2007
419 Scams: Nigerian 419 Scams—an practical overview
"Fraud Ring Uncovered in Nigeria". BBC News, 6 September 2007.
"UK Police in Nigerian Scam Haul". BBC News, 4 October 2007.
Last, Alex. "Anger Over Nigeria's Gang Blitz". BBC News, 4 October 2007.
articolotre.com

 
Student societies in Nigeria